Christian Mager (born 8 April 1992) is a German cyclist, who currently rides for German amateur teams CT Rhein-Main Rödermark and Team Bornträger–Assos.

Major results
2014
 4th Overall Tour de Berlin
2016
 8th Overall Tour des Fjords
2017
 2nd Overall Tour of Szeklerland
1st  Points classification
1st Stage 1
 8th Overall Oberösterreichrundfahrt
 9th Overall Tour du Maroc
1st Stage 4

References

External links

1992 births
Living people
German male cyclists
Sportspeople from Darmstadt
Cyclists from Hesse